The Ultra New Town Tavern is a club located at 600 West Jackson Avenue on the West Side of Las Vegas, Nevada.

History 
Established on July 5, 1955, it became known for its lounge, where Earl Thurman performed, though it also had blackjack and craps tables. It was customary for workers to go to the Town Tavern after their work shifts and party and jam until dawn. During the late 1950s it was the "it" place to go. Louis Armstrong, The Ink Spots, Little Milton, Ed Sullivan and many other performers were known to drop in. The original owner (Oscar Green Sr) of the Town Tavern was African American, but in 1958 or 1959, when Sarann Knight-Preddy, who had returned from Hawthorne, Nevada where she had run the first club licensed to a black woman, went to work there it had Chinese ownership.

On July 6, 1959, the business was renamed the New Town Tavern. As it had been in the 1950s, the Tavern was a "hot spot" and Cab Calloway, Chubby Checker, Nat King Cole, Sammy Davis Jr., and Sonny Liston all frequented the club prior to integration on the Vegas Strip. It changed hands several times before closing on December 30, 1970. It reopened 1981, and the owner sold out fairly quickly to Cubie Bush, Elijah “Baboo” Green, Clarence Ray and five others, known as Green and Associates. By this time, integration of the strip had diminished the businesses in West Las Vegas and it had begun slipping into decline. The club was licensed for blackjack, craps, keno, poker and slot machines and offered soul music as entertainment. It operated until 1993, when it was sold again.

The new owners renamed the bar the Ultra New Town Tavern and advertised that they had 36 slot machines and 2 gaming tables. In 2003, the ceiling collapsed and in 2010, the city closed it due to its deteriorated condition, after the owner passed in 2002 and was unable to secure funds for redevelopment.

References

Sources

Defunct nightclubs in the Las Vegas Valley
Defunct casinos in the Las Vegas Valley
1955 establishments in Nevada
2010 disestablishments in Nevada
West Las Vegas